The Hemnfjorden is a fjord in Trøndelag county in Norway. The fjord begins at the village of Kyrksæterøra at the mouths of the rivers Søo and Haugaelva. The fjord flows northwards until it joins the Trondheimsleia. The Åstfjorden and Snillfjorden are smaller fjords which branch off the main Hemnfjorden to the east into Orkland municipality.

The village of Heim lies along the western shore of the fjord, and the municipal center of Hemne, Kyrksæterøra lies at the southern end of the fjord, and the village of Ytre Snillfjord lies on the southeast side of the fjord.  The island of Hemnskjela lies at the mouth of the Hemnfjorden where it joins the Trondheimsleia.

See also
 List of Norwegian fjords

References

Heim, Norway
Hitra
Orkland
Fjords of Trøndelag